Sacrifice is the twelfth studio album by British rock band Motörhead. It was released on 27 March 1995 via SPV/Steamhammer, the band's first release on the label. It is the second and final album to feature the four-piece lineup of Lemmy, Phil Campbell, Würzel, and Mikkey Dee, as Würzel left the band after the album's recording.

Recording
Motörhead reunited with producer Howard Benson for Sacrifice. "This is a very good album", vocalist and bassist Lemmy wrote in the sleeve notes, "Put it in your system and your girlfriend's clothes fall off." Lemmy views Sacrifice as one of his favourite records the band has made, despite the difficulties involved, which he explained as:

In the documentary The Guts and the Glory, all three band members express regret over Würzel's departure, but insist it was inevitable, with drummer Mikkey Dee commenting:

Campbell, who joined Motörhead with Würzel in 1984, recalls: 

In the same film, Lemmy reveals that Würzel began to suspect that he was being ripped off financially:

The band went into the studio with some great songs, Lemmy recalls, although "Sex & Death" was written in ten minutes on the last day of recording, "In Another Time" was altered beyond all recognition and there were three sets of lyrics for "Make 'Em Blind". Dee and Campbell didn't realise that "Out of the Sun" was only two and half verses and had rehearsed it as such but Lemmy added another section when nobody else was around, with him playing bass and Jamie, his guitar roadie, playing guitar.  He then gave the others a tape of it. According to Lemmy, when Würzel played it in the rental car he nearly drove off the road. "Make 'Em Blind" came from improvisation, with Campbell recording the solo in one take, falling over the couch and onto his back laughing uproariously. Lemmy states that the album contains more nonsense than most of the previous album – the lyrics don't mean anything you can really get a hold of – but that they convey the mood, especially the title track and "Out of the Sun". "Dog Face Boy" is about Campbell, but Lemmy decided that only after having written it, likening the line "Poor boy out your mind again/Jet plane outside looking for another friend" to Campbell's habit of quickly hitting town and looking for fun after getting off the plane.

Release
It was not a success nor did it make much impact on the album charts, as with the previous album, it was largely ignored by the general public. With a new label it was released correctly, compared to Bastards, and the title track has stayed in the live set for some time, but there hasn't been much written about this album that is noteworthy.

The title track was used in the movie Tromeo and Juliet, a film in which Lemmy appears.

The American version of the album cover had Würzel airbrushed out but, according to Joel McIver's book Overkill: The Untold Story of Motörhead, Lemmy insists that this was the record label's idea, not theirs:  

Rather than hiring a new guitar player, the band decided to revert to a three-piece.

Sleeve artwork
Joe Petagno, the sleeve artist, was well known for inserting references to genitalia in his drawings, and this one was no exception. He commented:

Critical reception

AllMusic states that:

In 2011, Motörhead biographer Joel McIver wrote that Sacrifice "was exactly what you expect: a decent, if unspectacular, Motörhead record with a couple classics song here and there."

Track listing

Personnel
Per the Sacrifice liner notes.
 Lemmy – lead vocals, bass
 Phil "Zööm" Campbell – guitars; guitar solo on all tracks except "Dog Face Boy"
 Michael "Würzel" Burston – guitars; guitar solo on "Dog Face Boy" and "Out of the Sun"
 Mikkey Dee – drums
 Bill Bergman – saxophone on "Don't Waste Your Time"
 John Paroulo – piano on "Don't Waste Your Time"
Würzel is uncredited on the North American CD release album liner notes, that was also sold in other territories, other than to state he played guitar solo on two tracks. He is not listed as a member of the band, or for writing credits either, even though he plays rhythm guitar on the entire album.The SPV German/European release of the album has the correct liner notes; Würzels thank-you's, writing credits, etc.

Production 
Howard Benson – producer, mixing
Ryan Dorn – producer, engineer, mixing
Devin Foutz – assistant engineer
Matthew Ellard – assistant engineer
Eddy Schreyer – mastering
Motörhead – executive producers
Gene Kirkland – photography
Robert John – photography
DemoNet, Inc – art design and layout
David Patterson – typeface and pagemaster
Joe Petagno – Snaggletooth, album cover

Charts

References

External links
 Sample tracks at Rolling Stone
 Motörhead official website

Motörhead albums
1995 albums
Albums with cover art by Joe Petagno
Albums produced by Howard Benson
SPV/Steamhammer albums
CMC International albums